Mario Castellani (24 November 190625 April 1978) was an Italian comic actor, best known as the sidekick of famous comic actor Antonio De Curtis (Totò). He appeared with the latter in all his major movies, as well as many of Totò's theatre productions.

Filmography
Below is a partial list of his films—

External links

1906 births
1978 deaths
Italian male comedians
Male actors from Rome
20th-century Italian male actors
Italian male film actors
Italian male stage actors
Italian male television actors
20th-century Italian comedians